The first season of Without a Trace premiered September 26, 2002 on CBS and concluded on May 15, 2003. There are 23 episodes in this season. It was released on DVD in region 1 on September 14, 2004. In region 2, the first season was released on DVD in the UK on January 10, 2005 and in Germany on February 25, 2005. In region 4 the first season was released on December 12, 2004.

Cast
 Anthony LaPaglia as John Michael Malone
 Poppy Montgomery as Samantha Spade
 Marianne Jean-Baptiste as Vivian Johnson
 Enrique Murciano as Danny Taylor
 Eric Close as Martin Fitzgerald

Crew
Writers:
Hank Steinberg (8 episodes)
Ed Redlich (3 episodes)
Greg Walker (3 episodes)
Allison Abner (2 episodes)
Jacob Epstein (2 episodes)
Jan Nash (2 episodes)
Francisco Castro (1 episodes)
Steven Kane (1 episode)
Harry Litman (1 episode)
Maria Maggenti (1 episode)
Stacy Rukeyser(1 episodes)

Directors:
Paul Holahan (6 episode)
Peter Markle (4 episodes)
Kevin Hooks (2 episodes)
David Nutter (2 episodes)
Randall Zisk (2 episodes)
Charlie Correll (1 episode)
Mel Damski (1 episode)
Steve Gormer (1 episodes)
Leslie Libman (1 episode)
Michelle MacLaren (1 episode)
John McNaughton (1 episode)
Tom McLoughlin (1 episode)
Deran Sarafian (1 episode)
Rachel Talalay (1 episodes)

Episodes

References 

Without a Trace seasons
2002 American television seasons
2003 American television seasons